Bothrops marmoratus, also known as the marbled lancehead, is a species of snake in the family Viperidae. It is native to Brazil.

Taxonomy 
The specific epithet of this species is a reference to the fact that this species pigmentation looks marbled.
The holotype for the species was an adult female collected in Ipameri in Brazil.
It belongs to the Bothrops neuwidi species group.

Distribution 
The species is known to inhabit only the state of Goiás in Brazil.

Ecology 
The snake is nocturnal and viviparous.

References 

Reptiles described in 2008
marmoratus